Socket 940 is a 940-pin socket for 64-bit AMD Opteron server processors and AMD Athlon 64 FX consumer processors. This socket is entirely square in shape and pins are arranged in a grid with the exception of four key pins used to align the processor and the corners. AMD's Opteron and the older AMD Athlon 64 FX (FX-51) use Socket 940.

Technical specifications
Microprocessors designed for this socket were intended to be used in a server platform, and as such provide additional features to provide additional robustness. One such feature is the acceptance of only registered memory. 

While the more recent 940-pin socket AM2 is visually similar to this one, the two are electrically incompatible due to the integrated memory controller. Socket 940 CPUs integrate a DDR controller, whereas AM2 models use a DDR2 controller.

See also
List of AMD microprocessors

References

External links
AMD Product Information
AMD Technical Details for Athlon64 and Athlon FX
AMD Socket 940 Design Specification (rev 3.03)
AMD 940 Pin Package Functional Data Sheet (rev 3.05)

AMD server sockets